Parathion, also called parathion-ethyl or diethyl parathion and locally known as "Folidol", is an organophosphate insecticide and acaricide. It was originally developed by IG Farben in the 1940s. It is highly toxic to non-target organisms, including humans, so its use has been banned or restricted in most countries. The basic structure is shared by parathion methyl.

History

Parathion was developed by Gerhard Schrader for the German trust IG Farben in the 1940s.  After World War II and the collapse of IG Farben due to the war crime trials, the Western allies seized the patent, and parathion was marketed worldwide by different companies and under different brand names. The most common German brand was E605 (banned in Germany after 2002); this was not a food-additive "E number" as used in the EU today. "E" stands for Entwicklungsnummer (German for "development number").  It is an irreversible acetylcholinesterase inhibitor.

Safety concerns have later led to the development of parathion methyl, which is somewhat less toxic.

In the EU, Parathion was banned after 2001.  In Switzerland, the substance is no longer approved as a pesticide.

Handling properties
Pure parathion is a white crystalline solid. It is commonly distributed as a brown liquid that smells of rotting eggs or garlic. The insecticide is somewhat stable, although it darkens when exposed to sunlight.

Industrial synthesis
Parathion is synthesized from diethyl dithiophosphoric acid (C2H5O)2PS2H by chlorination to generate diethylthiophosphoryl chloride ((C2H5O)2P(S)Cl), and then the chloride is treated with sodium 4-nitrophenolate (the sodium salt of 4-nitrophenol).

 2 (C2H5O)2P(S)SH  +  3 Cl2   →   2 (C2H5O)2P(S)Cl +  S2Cl2  +  2 HCl
 (C2H5O)2P(S)Cl + NaOC6H4NO2   →   (C2H5O)2P(S)OC6H4NO2  +  NaCl

Applications
As a pesticide, parathion is generally applied by spraying.  It is often applied to cotton, rice and fruit trees. The usual concentrations of ready-to-use solutions are 0.05 to 0.1%. The chemical is banned for use on many food crops.

Insecticidal activity
Parathion acts on the enzyme acetylcholinesterase indirectly.  After an insect (or a human) ingests parathion, an oxidase replaces the double bonded sulfur with oxygen to give paraoxon.

(C2H5O)2P(S)OC6H4NO2  +  1/2 O2 →   (C2H5O)2P(O)OC6H4NO2  +  S

The phosphate ester is more reactive in organisms than the phosphorothiolate ester, as the phosphorus atoms become much more electropositive.

Parathion  is a special case of acetylcholinesterase inhibitor resistance.

Degradation
Degradation of parathion leads to more water-soluble products.  Hydrolysis, which deactivates the molecule, occurs at the aryl ester bond resulting in diethyl thiophosphate and 4-nitrophenol.
(C2H5O)2P(S)OC6H4NO2 + H2O →  HOC6H4NO2 + (C2H5O)2P(S)OH
Degradation proceeds differently under anaerobic conditions: the nitro group on parathion is reduced to the amine.
(C2H5O)2P(S)OC6H4NO2 +  6 H →  (C2H5O)2P(S)OC6H4NH2  +  2 H2O

Safety
Parathion is a cholinesterase inhibitor. It generally disrupts the nervous system by inhibiting acetylcholinesterase. It is absorbed via skin, mucous membranes, and orally. Absorbed parathion is rapidly metabolized to paraoxon, as described in Insecticidal activity. Paraoxon exposure can result in headaches, convulsions, poor vision, vomiting, abdominal pain, severe diarrhea, unconsciousness, tremor, dyspnea, and finally pulmonary edema as well as respiratory arrest.  Symptoms of poisoning are known to last for extended periods, sometimes months. The most common and very specific antidote is atropine, in doses of up to 100 mg daily. Because atropine may also be toxic, it is recommended that small frequently repeated doses be used in treatment. If human poisoning is detected early and the treatment is prompt (atropine and artificial respiration), fatalities are infrequent. Insufficient oxygen will lead to cerebral hypoxia and permanent brain damage.  Peripheral neuropathy including paralysis is noticed as late sequelae after recovery from acute intoxication. Parathion and related organophosphorus pesticides are used in hundreds of thousands of poisonings annually, especially suicides. It is known as Schwiegermuttergift (mother-in-law poison) in Germany. For this reason, most formulations contain a blue dye providing warning.

Parathion was used as a chemical warfare agent, most notably by an element of the British South Africa Police (BSAP) attached to the Selous Scouts during the Rhodesian Bush War. They used it to poison clothing that was then supplied to anti-government guerrillas. When the enemy soldiers put on the clothes, they were poisoned by absorption through the skin.

Based on animal studies, parathion is considered by the U.S. Environmental Protection Agency to be a possible human carcinogen. Studies show that parathion is toxic to fetuses, but does not cause birth defects.

It is classified by the United Nations Environment Programme (UNEP) as a persistent organic pollutant and by the World Health Organization (WHO) as Toxicity Class Ia (extremely hazardous).

Parathion is toxic to bees, fish, birds, and other forms of wildlife.

Protection against poisoning
To provide the end user with a minimum standard of protection, suitable protective gloves, clothing, and a respirator with organic-vapour cartridges is normally worn. Industrial safety during the production process requires special ventilation and continuous measurement of air contamination in order not to exceed PEL levels, as well as careful attention to personal hygiene. Frequent analysis of workers' serum acetylcholinesterase activity is also helpful with regards to occupational safety, because the action of parathion is cumulative. Also, atropine has been used as a specific antidote.

See also
 Pesticide toxicity to bees
 Parathion methyl

References

External links
 
 ATSDR - Methyl Parathion Expert Panel Report U.S. Department of Health and Human Services (public domain)
 CDC - NIOSH Pocket Guide to Chemical Hazards U.S. Department of Health and Human Services (public domain)
 Ethyl parathion: 
 Methyl parathion: 

Obsolete pesticides
Organophosphate insecticides
Acetylcholinesterase inhibitors
Organothiophosphate esters
Nitrobenzenes
IARC Group 2B carcinogens
Phenol esters
Ethyl esters